The Dutch intervention in Bali in 1906 was a Dutch military intervention in Bali as part of the Dutch colonial suppression, killing over 1,000 people, most of whom were civilians. It was part of the Dutch campaign for the suppression of most of the Netherlands East-Indies. The campaign killed the Balinese rulers of Badung and their wives and children, as well as destroying the southern Bali kingdoms of Badung and Tabanan and weakening the kingdom of Klungkung. It was the sixth Dutch military intervention in Bali.

Context

The Netherlands had already conquered northern Bali by the middle of the 19th century, integrating the kingdoms of Jembrana, Buleleng and Karangasem into the Dutch East Indies, but the southern kingdoms of Tabanan, Badung and Klungkung had managed to remain independent. Various disputes took place between the Dutch and the southern kingdoms, and it was expected that the Dutch would intervene militarily once a pretext presented itself.

Leading up to the intervention of 1906, the Dutch had seen successes in Gianyar in establishing an administration system that efficiently collected and utilized taxes. Bridges and roads and irrigation systems were improved and the justice system was reformed. One result of the successes in Gianyar was an increase in refugees from neighboring kingdoms seeking to escape slavery, corruption, and tyranny of other kingdoms. As a result of these successes and in general the very presence of the Dutch near the sacred Puri Klungkung, the Dewa Agung began a campaign of general harassment of the Dutch. The culmination of this harassment and the eventual pretext for the intervention was the Dewa Agung's support of the justification of the plundering of a shipwreck near Sanur.

There were recurrent disputes between the Dutch and Balinese kings regarding the right to plunder ships that foundered off the reefs surrounding Bali. According to Balinese tradition called tawan karang, the Balinese king traditionally considered such wrecks as their property, while the Dutch insisted they were not. On 27 May 1904, a Chinese schooner named Sri Kumala struck the reef near Sanur, and was plundered by the Balinese. Upon request for compensation by the Dutch, the kings of Badung refused to pay anything, supported by the king of Tabanan, the king of Klungkung, and the Dewa Agung. The ruler of Tabanan had also caused Dutch discontent by authorizing in 1904 the practice of suttee (ritual self-sacrifice of relatives upon the death of a ruler, also called wesatia) despite a Dutch formal request to abandon it.

In June 1906, the Dutch started a blockade of the southern coasts and sent various ultimata.

Intervention 

On September 14, 1906, a substantial force of the Royal Dutch East Indies Army, named the Sixth Military Expedition, landed at the northern part of Sanur beach. It was under the command of Major General M.B. Rost van Tonningen. Badung soldiers made some attacks on the bivouacs of the Dutch at Sanur on September 15, and there was some resistance again at Intaran village.

Kesiman 
Overall, the force managed to move inland without much resistance, and arrived in the city of Kesiman on 20 September 1906. There, the local king, a vassal of the king of Badung, had already been killed by his own priest, as he had refused to lead an armed resistance against the Dutch, the palace was in flames and the city was deserted.

Denpasar 
The force marched to Denpasar, Bali, as if in a dress parade. They approached the royal palace, noting smoke rising from the puri and hearing a wild beating of drums coming from within the palace walls.

Upon their reaching the palace, a silent procession emerged, led by the Raja being borne by four bearers on a palanquin. The Raja was dressed in traditional white cremation garments, wore magnificent jewellery, and carried a ceremonial kris. The other people in the procession consisted of the Raja's officials, guards, priests, wives, children and retainers, all of whom were similarly attired. They had received the rites of death, were dressed in white, and had had their ritual kris blessed.

When the procession was a hundred paces from the Dutch force, they halted and the Raja stepped down from the palanquin and signalled a priest, who plunged his dagger into the Raja's breast. The rest of the procession began killing themselves and others, in a rite known as Puputan ("Fight to the death"). Women mockingly threw jewellery and gold coins at the troops.

A 'stray gunshot' and an 'attack by lance and spear' prompted the Dutch to open fire with rifles and artillery. As more people emerged from the palace, the mounds of corpses rose higher and higher. The whole procession numbered hundreds, and is said to have been over 1,000 people in all. It was mown down by Dutch gunfire.

Alternative accounts describe that the Dutch first opened fire on the Balinese people moving outside of the palace gate, only equipped with traditional krises, spears and shields, and that survivors killed themselves, or had themselves killed by their followers according to the dictates of the puputan.

The soldiers stripped the corpses of the valuables and sacked the ruins of the burned palace. The palace of Denpasar was razed to the ground.

The same afternoon, similar events occurred in the nearby palace of Pemecutan, where the co-ruler Gusti Gede Ngurah resided. The Dutch let the nobility at Pemecutan kill themselves, and proceeded with the looting.

The massacre is remembered locally as the "Badung Puputan" and is glorified as an example of resistance to foreign aggression. A huge bronze monument was elevated on the central square of Denpasar, where the royal palace used to stand, glorifying Balinese resistance in the Puputan.

Tabanan 
The Dutch force continued to the kingdom of Tabanan, where the king Gusti Ngurah Agung and his son fled, then surrendered to the Dutch, and attempted to negotiate a settlement to become a regency of the Dutch.

The Dutch only offered them exile to nearby Madura or Lombok, and they preferred to kill themselves (puputan) in prison two days later.
Their palace was plundered and razed by the Dutch.

Klungkung 

The Dutch also moved troops to Klungkung and considered an attack on king Dewa Agung, the nominal ruler of all Bali, but eventually refrained from it as Dewa Agung refrained from military action against the Dutch and agreed to sign agreements to destroy his fortifications, deliver his firearms and renounce import and export taxes.

A strong pretext for the Dutch to attack Klunkung would appear later, and materialize in the 1908 Dutch intervention in Bali, which would put a final end to autochthonous rule in Bali.

Aftermath 
In the short term, the 1906 Dutch invasion in Bali, and its sequel in 1908, sealed the Dutch control of the island.

The Dutch invasion however was followed closely by media coverage, and reports of the bloody conquest of the southern part of the island filtered to the West. The disproportion between the offense and harshness of the punitive actions was pointed out. The image of the Netherlands as a benevolent and responsible colonial power was seriously affected as a consequence.

The Netherlands, also under criticism for their policies in Java, Sumatra and the eastern island, decided to make amends, and announced the establishment of an "Ethical policy". As a consequence, the Dutch in Bali turned students and protectors of Balinese culture and endeavored to preserve it in addition to their initial modernization role. Efforts were made at preserving Bali culture and at making it a "living museum" of classical culture, and in 1914, Bali was opened to tourism. The very harshness of the 1906 and 1908 military invasions thus paradoxically triggered an international uproar which contributed to the preservation of Bali's culture, to make the island one of the most popular tourist destinations today.

In fiction 
Vicki Baum's 1937 historical novel Love and Death in Bali (Liebe und Tod auf Bali) tells of a family caught up in the 1906 events. The book was written after Baum's visit to Bali in 1935, when she became close friends with Walter Spies, a German painter who lived on the island for many years and who provided her with much information on these  events - at the time still well within living memory.

Gallery

Notes

References 

Conflicts in 1906
1906 in the Dutch East Indies
History of Bali
Wars involving the Netherlands
Dutch conquest of Indonesia
Bali 1906
September 1906 events
October 1906 events

nl:Expeditie naar Bali 1906 - 1908